The 2018 European Rowing Championships were rowing championships for European members of the International Rowing Federation (FISA) plus Israel. They were held as part of a new multi-sport European Championships at the Strathclyde Country Park near Motherwell, Scotland.

Background

2018 was the first time that the European Rowing Championships, first held in 1893, were being held in Scotland. Competitions were being held in 17 boat classes with both lightweight and open weight events. Nearly 500 rowers were participating. The host, British Rowing, had nominated a 53-strong team for the competition.

Medal summary

Men

Women

Medal table

References

External links
 Results book − Rowing 

European Rowing Championships
2018
International sports competitions in Glasgow
European Rowing Championships
Rowing competitions in the United Kingdom
European Rowing Championships
Rowing
Rowing in Scotland
Sport in North Lanarkshire